The PolyMet Mine or NorthMet Mining Project is a proposed mining and processing operation in the NorthMet Deposit in northeastern Minnesota, United States,  south of Babbitt, Minnesota.  The project is controversial with potential environment effects being a major concern.

Summary
 Three open pit mines are planned with the deepest being about 700 feet. Grinding, separation and Sulphite
 Excavated material not desired (waste rock) would be stored next to the pits in large, 20-story high piles
 The hydrometallurgical process of flotation and autoclave leach the ore
 Tailings, the leftover sand-like particles of rock that have been stripped of their economic metals in flotation, will be collected and pumped in slurry form to the tailings basin.
 Some reclamation is planned and financial assurance plans are being made.

Potential benefits

Profitable business operation for Polymet Mining Corporation (corporate offices in Ottawa Canada) and major investors such as Swiss giant Glencore
Taxes for local and state revenue
Copper, nickel, and other minerals
Up to 500 direct full-time jobs

Concerns and potential problems

There are 275 million tons of proven and probable reserves grading 0.79 percent copper equivalent with Measured and Indicated Mineral Resources of 694. Large million tons grading 0.74 percent copper equivalent. Large quantities of overburden, waste rock, and processing tailings will be generated.
While some water processing is planned, elevated levels of mercury and aluminum are expected.
Contaminated waste water is planned to be contained. If leakage occurs, drainage would be through Partridge River, the Embarrass River, the St. Louis River, to Lake Superior.
operations would permanently affect 912.5 acres of wetlands
4,016.3-acre decrease in vegetation and wildlife habitat in the NorthMet Project area
Canada lynx habitat is a particular concern

References

External links
Minnesota DNR PolyMet site 
Go PolyMet company-sponsored site

Copper mines in the United States
Environmental impact of mining
Mining in Minnesota